Korea International Exhibition Center (commonly known as KINTEX) is a convention and exhibition center located in Ilsanseo-gu, Goyang, Gyeonggi Province, approximately  from Seoul, South Korea. It comprises two exhibition centers, one of which is connected to the office building of its parent company KINTEX Inc., and is the largest "MICE" venue in South Korea.

Overview 
It is a three-storey building on a  plot of land between Ilsan's central road, Chungangno, and the Han River. Shortly after opening, it hosted the 2005 Seoul Motor Show.

History 

 1999 04 Confirmed for Goyang city to attract the construction of an International Exhibition Center
 2002 02 Goyang International Exhibition Center was officially titled KINTEX (Korea International Exhibition Center)
 2003 03 Launched KINTEX CI
 2005 04 Grand Opening of the first KINTEX Center
 2006 12 Changed the corporate name to KINTEX, conducted the feasibility study for the second exhibition center
 2007 07 Verified the validity to construct the second exhibition center
 2008 12 Appointed the Hyundai Engineering and Construction Consortium to construct the second exhibition center
 2009 07 Started the Construction for the second exhibition center

Facilities
 Indoor exhibition area: first exhibition center , second exhibition center 
 Outdoor exhibition area: first exhibition center , second exhibition center 
 Event hall: seating capacity of 6,000 seats
 26 meeting rooms
 Grand ballroom

Notable events
As the country's largest exhibition center, KINTEX has hosted many regional trade fairs (organized by KOTRA) as well as international conventions and exhibitions. It is the main venue of the biennial Seoul Motor Show and is one of the venues of the Goyang International Flower Festival.

Kintex held Harvard WorldMUN 2015, and will host the World Universities Debating Championships in 2021.

Sports
KINTEX was the venue of the 2009 World Weightlifting Championships and the 2010 All That Skate figure skating show.

Entertainment
The venue has hosted various events such as SBS's year-end music program Gayo Daejeon, the 2013 Mnet 20's Choice Awards, Infinite Challenge Expo in December 2015 to January 2016, the 2016 tvN10 Awards, the 31st Golden Disc Awards and, more recently, the Booting Evaluations stage of the survival competition The Unit. The 32nd Golden Disc Awards will take place at KINTEX on January 10–11, 2018.

Tests
Many important tests, such as civil service examination and Company entrance examination are taken in the KINTEX.

References

External links 
 KINTEX official website 

Convention centers in South Korea
Buildings and structures in Goyang